The 2002 Asian Taekwondo Championships are the 15th edition of the Asian Taekwondo Championships, and were held in Amman, Jordan from April 26 to April 28, 2002.

South Korea dominated the competition, winning twelve gold medals.

Medal summary

Men

Women

Medal table

References
 Results

External links
WT Official Website

Asian Championships
Asian Taekwondo Championships
Asian Taekwondo Championships
Taekwondo Championships